Come Blow Your Horn is a 1963 American comedy film directed by Bud Yorkin from a screenplay by Norman Lear, based on the 1961 play of the same name by Neil Simon. The film stars Frank Sinatra, Lee J. Cobb, Molly Picon, Barbara Rush, and Jill St. John.

Plot
Buddy Baker is bored living with his parents. He goes to the big-city apartment of older brother Alan, who works for their father's artificial-fruit company but never lets business interfere with a good time.

A confirmed bachelor, Alan is all too willing to teach his younger brother a few tricks, improve his wardrobe, even introduce him to Peggy, a girl with an apartment upstairs. Alan's steadiest companion is Connie, but even she's running out of patience with his lack of interest in settling down.

A jealous husband accuses Alan of running around with his wife and beats him up. Alan begins rethinking his life. He proposes marriage to Connie and then intervenes when he hears that his own parents are contemplating a divorce. Giving up his own ways for good, Alan even turns over his swinging bachelor pad to Buddy.

Cast
 Frank Sinatra as Alan Baker
 Lee J. Cobb as Harry R. Baker
 Molly Picon as Mrs. Sophie Baker
 Barbara Rush as Connie
 Jill St. John as Peggy John
 Dan Blocker as Mr. Eckman
 Phyllis McGuire as Mrs. Eckman (buyer for Neiman-Marcus)
 Tony Bill as Buddy Baker

Norman Lear and Dean Martin both make cameo appearances in this film.

Reception

Box office performance
Come Blow Your Horn was the 15th highest-grossing film of 1963, grossing $12,705,882 in the United States, earning $6 million in domestic rentals.

Awards
The film was nominated for an Academy Award for Best Art Direction (Hal Pereira, Roland Anderson, Samuel M. Comer, James W. Payne).

See also
 Frank Sinatra filmography

References

External links
 
 
 
 
 

1963 films
1963 directorial debut films
1963 comedy films
1960s English-language films
American comedy films
American films based on plays
Films based on works by Neil Simon
Films directed by Bud Yorkin
Films scored by Nelson Riddle
Films set in New York City
Films with screenplays by Norman Lear
Paramount Pictures films
Films produced by Norman Lear
1960s American films